Bay Rock Light is an inactive lighthouse which used to be located on Bay Rock, a rocky islet northwest of Magnetic Island, about  north of Townsville, Queensland, Australia. First lit in 1886, it was automated in 1920 and deactivated in the 1980s. It was relocated in 1992 to the Townsville Maritime Museum, where it is now displayed.

History

Bay Rock Light was first lit in 1886. It was originally located on Bay Rock, at location , its main use being assisting vessels into a quarantine station on West Point, Magnetic Island. It also assisted passage into Cleveland Bay or to a main shipping anchorage off Bay Rock.

It was the fourth in a group of eight lighthouses made of hardwood frame clad with corrugated iron, which included, by order of establishment Little Sea Hill Light, Grassy Hill Light, Goods Island Light, itself, Old Caloundra Light, North Point Hummock Light (demolished), Gatcombe Head Light (demolished) and Bulwer Island Light. The original light source was a Kerosene mantle with an intensity of 1,200 cd. The original lens was a 4th order dioptric.

The lighthouse was originally manned, and a small cottage accommodated the keeper and his family. The last keeper was John Albert Edward Lawson. In March 1920 John Lawson was lost at sea when a small fishing boat capsized. This led to the decision to automate the operation of the lighthouse, and it was demanned in 1920. The light was converted to an automatic acetylene gas burner (carbide lamp).

During the 1980s the lighthouse was deactivated and replaced with a small fiberglass beacon. The beacon has NGA number 111-10030 and Admiralty number K3117. It is still active, displaying a characteristic of two white flashes, every eight seconds (Fl.(2)W. 8s).

In 1992 the lighthouse was relocated to the Townsville Maritime Museum. The top of the lighthouse was transported with an emergency services helicopter. The lighthouse was restored by Queensland Transport, and officially opened to the public in September, 2003.

Visiting
The Townsville Maritime Museum is located on the south side of Ross Creek, in Townsville. It is open daily, for a fee.

See also

 List of lighthouses in Australia

Notes

References

Bibliography

Lighthouses completed in 1886
Lighthouses in Queensland
Buildings and structures in Townsville
1886 establishments in Australia